The cone-eared calyptotis (Calyptotis lepidorostrum)  is a species of skink found in Queensland in Australia.

References

Calyptotis
Reptiles described in 1983
Taxa named by Allen Eddy Greer